Dong Moon Joo is a Korean American businessman. A member of the Unification Church, he is best known as the president of the church-affiliated newspaper The Washington Times. In 2009 Joo was let go from the Times by its then owner, Hyun Jin Moon. In 2011 he was again serving as president of the Times and visited North Korea, along with Unification Church president Hyung Jin Moon and Pyeonghwa Motors president Sang Kwon Park, to offer condolences on the death of North Korean leader Kim Jong-il. Joo was born in North Korea and is now a citizen of the United States. During the presidency of George W. Bush, Joo had undertaken unofficial diplomatic missions to North Korea in an effort to improve its relationship with the United States.

References

See also 
 Unification Church and North Korea

Year of birth missing (living people)
Living people
North Korean emigrants to the United States
American people of Korean descent
American businesspeople
American Unificationists
The Washington Times people
Corporate executives